The potato onion (also known as an Egyptian onion, underground onion or multiplier onion) is a group of varieties which Maud Grieve calls Allium × proliferum but has also been classed in the Aggregatum Group of Allium cepa, similar to the shallot. It sometimes produces irregular-shaped or round bulbs, which in some old English varieties may be large, although others may be less so.

It is planted from bulbs, not from seed. It should be planted in the fall to early spring. Sources differ about planting depth, some saying shallow planting is appropriate and others calling for deeper planting.

References

External links 

Onion cultivars
Perennial vegetables